The Devil's Crown is a BBC television series which dramatised the reigns of three medieval Kings of England: Henry II and his sons Richard I and John. It is also known as La couronne du Diable in French.

The series was written by Jack Russell and Ken Taylor. It was shown in the United Kingdom in thirteen 55-minute episodes between 30 April and 23 July 1978.

A full set of tape copies exist at the British Film Institute, where they can be viewed on request.
It has never been released on DVD, although a French dubbed version, called "La couronne du Diable", is available as a paid download.

Summary
Henry Plantagenet (latterly Henry II), sees his opportunity to seize the crown of England and create a kingdom of law and order. He cuts a deal with King Stephen in which Stephen will name him his heir, excluding his sons Eustace and William in exchange for a fragile truce. Stephen's sudden death elevates Henry to the throne. He may have been King of England, but the bulk of the Angevin Empire was in France, and it was this that Henry regarded as the Jewel in his Crown, maintained through a series of political marriages and complex allegiances. Henry pays homage to Louis VII, King of the Franks, for these lands, but it is clear that Henry is the shrewder and more ambitious of the two kings, having married Louis' ex-wife Eleanor of Aquitaine.

Cast
 Brian Cox as Henry II of England
 Michael Byrne as Richard I of England
 Glen Barlow as younger Richard
 Adrian Clark as young Richard
 Paul Rose as thirteen-year-old Richard
 Lawrence Clark as seven-year-old Richard
 John Duttine as John, King of England
 Paul Spurrier as young John
 Jane Lapotaire as Eleanor of Aquitaine
 Christopher Gable as Philip II of France
 Ralph Arliss as Geoffrey, Count of Nantes
 Charles Kay as Louis VII of France
 Jack Shepherd as Thomas Becket
 Kevin McNally as Henry the Young King
 Dominic Savage as young Henry
 Martin Neil as Geoffrey II, Duke of Brittany
 Austin Somervell as young Geoffrey
 Zoë Wanamaker as Berengaria of Navarre
 Lynsey Baxter as Isabella of Angoulême 
 Freddie Jones as Bertran de Born
 Peter Benson as Blondel de Nesle
 Roy Boyd as Ranulf de Glanville
 Lucy Gutteridge as Alys, Countess of the Vexin
 Lorna Yabsley as thirteen-year-old Alys
 Michael Hawkins as Richard de Luci
 Ian Hogg as William de Braose, 4th Lord of Bramber
 Ralph Michael as Hubert Walter
 Patrick Troughton as William Marshal, 1st Earl of Pembroke
 Nina Francis as Constance, Duchess of Brittany
 Paula Williams as young Constance
 Simon Gipps-Kent as Arthur I, Duke of Brittany
 Joanne Stevens as Joan of England, Queen of Sicily
 Bob Goody as Guide
 Elizabeth Stewart as Midwife
 Susannah Fellows as Rosamund de Clifford
 Bruce Purchase as Geoffrey Plantagenet, Count of Anjou
 Brenda Bruce as Empress Matilda
 Frederick Treves as Stephen, King of England
 Thorley Walters as Gilbert Foliot
 Norman Etlinger as the Archbishop of York

Episode List
Ep.1 - If All the World Were Mine
Ep.2 - The Earth Is Not Enough
Ep.3 - A Rose, a Thorn
Ep.4 - The Hungry Falcons
Ep.5 - Before the Dark
Ep.6 - Richard Yea and Nay
Ep.7 - Lion of Christendom
Ep.8 - When Cage-Birds Sing
Ep.9 - Bolt from the Blue
Ep.10 - In Sun's Eclipse
Ep.11 - The Flowers Are Silent
Ep.12 - Tainted King
Ep.13 - To the Devil They Go

See also
List of historical drama films

References

External links

1978 British television series debuts
1978 British television series endings
1970s British drama television series
BBC television dramas
BBC television royalty dramas
Historical television series
BBC television miniseries
Henry II of England
Cultural depictions of Richard I of England
Cultural depictions of Eleanor of Aquitaine
Cultural depictions of John, King of England
Cultural depictions of Empress Matilda
Henry the Young King
English-language television shows
1970s British television miniseries